Lucille Watahomigie (born 1945 in Valentine, Arizona) is a Hualapai educator and linguist and native speaker of the Hualapai language.

Biography
After receiving her bachelor's degree in elementary education from Northern Arizona University, she returned to the Hualapai community of Peach Springs and became a teacher at the Peach Springs School. She went on to receive her master's degree at the University of Arizona, where she then worked as a professor for three years before returning to the Hualapai Nation in 1975 to found the Hualapai bilingual and bicultural education program in response to community demand. In 1982, she co-authored the first full reference grammar of her language, "Hualapai Reference Grammar", as well as a dictionary, and was instrumental in developing a practical orthography for Hualapai. In 1987, she founded the American Indian Language Development Institute at the University of Arizona, resulting in the linguistic training of many indigenous language educators and promoting the development and revitalization of native languages in Arizona and throughout the country. The AILDI was the inspiration for the Canadian Indigenous Languages and Literacy Development Institute (CILLDE) which was formed in 1999. She has also taught at the institute since its inception and continues to teach there on a regular basis. Some of her other published works include "Spirit Mountain: A Yuman Anthology", of which she was an editor, as well as works on bilingual education, ethnobotany, education, linguistics and language revitalization.

References

External links 
 Brief biography of Lucille Watahomigie written by her colleague Ofelia Zepeda

1945 births
Living people
People from Mohave County, Arizona
Native American language revitalization
Linguists from the United States
Women linguists
Hualapai people
Linguists of Havasupai–Hualapai